The Black Whale is a 1934 German drama film directed by Fritz Wendhausen and starring Emil Jannings, Angela Salloker and Max Gülstorff. It is based on the 1931 play Fanny by Marcel Pagnol.

The film's sets were designed by the art directors Otto Erdmann and Hans Sohnle. It was shot at the Halensee Studios in Berlin. Because the film had a Jewish producer it has some production issues due to the takeover of the Nazi Party. It premiered at the Ufa-Palast am Zoo.

Plot
The Black Whale is the German version of Marcel Pagnol's master piece Fanny. Peter Petersen's son Martin abandoned his pregnant girlfriend Fanny to chase adventures on the sea. Peter Petersen then married Fanny with his friend Pannies, who adopted and raised the baby as his own. Martin return after several years determined to have Fanny and the child back.

Cast
Emil Jannings as Peter Petersen
Angela Salloker as Fanny Jürgens
Max Gülstorff as Pannies
Franz Nicklisch as Martin Petersen
Albert Florath as Captain
Reinhold Gerstenberg as postman
Käthe Haack as Josefine
Margarete Kupfer as Mrs. Jürgens
Karl Platen as old skipper
Hans Richter as stoker boy
Willi Schaeffers as Bruns

References

External links

German Films

German drama films
Films of Nazi Germany
Films directed by Fritz Wendhausen
German films based on plays
Films based on works by Marcel Pagnol
Remakes of French films
German black-and-white films
Films with screenplays by Fritz Wendhausen
1934 drama films
1930s German films
Films shot at Halensee Studios
1930s German-language films